Donato Manfroi (27 October 1940 – 27 October 2022) was an Italian politician. A member of the Lega Nord, the Liga Veneta Repubblica, and European Democracy, he served in the Senate of the Republic from 1992 to 2001.

Manfroi died in Cencenighe Agordino on 27 October 2022, his 82nd birthday.

References

1940 births
2022 deaths
Lega Nord politicians
Members of the Senate of the Republic (Italy)
Senators of Legislature XI of Italy
Senators of Legislature XII of Italy
Senators of Legislature XIII of Italy
People from the Province of Belluno